The Season of Annunciation or Season of Announcements (also known by various Syriac transliterations, such as Subara, Subbara, or Suboro), is a liturgical season in Syriac Christianity. The name of the season is in reference to the Annunciation to the Blessed Virgin Mary, the announcement by the Archangel Gabriel to the Blessed Virgin Mary, that she would conceive and bear a son through a virgin birth and become the mother of Jesus Christ. 

In the East Syriac tradition the liturgical year starts with Annunciation season. The season is equivalent to the season of Advent in the Western liturgical tradition. Like Advent, it is a time for the celebration of the Nativity of Jesus. But unlike Advent, the whole season is a celebration of the Nativity, while in Advent the first 24 days are a preparation for the Nativity on 25 December. 

Historically, the Annunciation season in the Syro-Malabar Church came to an end in early January with the feast of Epiphany (Pindikuthi Perunnal) which was the more celebrated feast. But by the 20th century, due to influence of the Western tradition and the secular world, Christmas day (December 25) became the focal point of the season.

East Syriac Rite 

In the East Syriac Rite, the Season of Annunciation, like Advent in the Roman Rite, marks the start of the liturgical year, and begins on the Sunday that falls between November 27 and December 3 inclusive. The season extends past Advent to also include Christmastide. However, the present-day liturgical calendar of the Syro-Malabar Catholic Church (one of the churches that uses the East Syriac Rite) regards "Annunciation" and "Nativity" as separate seasons, with the Season of Annunciation ending prior to Christmas.

West Syriac Rite 

Churches that follow the West Syriac Rite call this period the Season of Annunciation (as with the Syro-Malankara Catholic Church) or the Season of Announcements (as with the Maronite Church). In this rite, the season begins six Sundays before Christmas, making it coterminous with Advent in the Ambrosian Rite.

See also 
 Advent
 Nativity Fast

References 

Liturgical seasons
Nativity of Jesus in worship and liturgy